Buell's Creek Reservoir is a man-made reservoir north of Brockville, Ontario, in Mac Johnson Wildlife Area. It can be accessed from Debruge Road. It contains no fish. There is a 2.7 kilometre walking trail around the lake that is accessible from Centennial Road.

References

Lakes of Leeds and Grenville United Counties